Old Low Light is Kathryn Williams' third album, released on EastWest Records on 30 September 2002. The Guardian newspaper regarded it as a disappointing follow-up to the Mercury-nominated Little Black Numbers with The Independent suggesting Williams "applies a subtle measured approach to songs whose ambiguities linger long after they have finished". The track "Old Low Light #2" does not appear on this album but is on her fifth album release, 'Over Fly Over'.

Track listing 
 "Little Black Numbers" – 2:54
 "White, Blue and Red" – 2:24
 "Mirrorball" – 5:03
 "Devices" – 3:20
 "Daydream and Saunter" – 3:57
 "Beatles" – 3:40
 "Wolf" – 3:39
 "Tradition" – 3:21
 "Swimmer" – 2:41
 "On For You" – 2:42
 "No One Takes You Home" – 5:27
 "3AM Phonecall" – 2:24

Personnel 
 Kathryn Williams – vocals, shaker and guitar
 Laura Reid – strings, backing vocals and organ
 Johnny Bridgwood – double bass and backing vocals
 Alex Tustin – drums, backing vocals and percussion
 Graham Hardy – flugelhorn and trumpet
 Gail Hutchinson – viola
 David Scott – piano and backing vocals

Recording details 
 Recorded at Monnow Valley, Wild Trax and Head studios
 Produced by Head and Kathryn Williams
 Artwork photography by Neil De Flohic and Margaret Williams

References 

Kathryn Williams albums
2002 albums